The Extraordinary and Plenipotentiary Ambassador of Peru to the Swiss Confederation is the official representative of the Republic of Peru to the Swiss Confederation. The Ambassador to Switzerland is also accredited to Liechtenstein.

Both countries established relations in 1884, and relations have been maintained since. A Swiss consulate opened in Lima in 1884, being transformed into a consulate general in 1931, before being elevated to the rank of legation in 1946 and embassy in 1957. During World War II, Switzerland represented Peru in Germany, Italy and France, at the same time representing those of the latter in Peru.

List of representatives

References

Switzerland
Peru